The Highlands at Harbor Springs is a ski resort in Northern Michigan located near Harbor Springs, Michigan owned and operated by  Boyne Resorts. It was known as Boyne Highlands until December 2021 when the resort announced the name change.

History
Harbor Highlands ski resort opened in 1955 with one slope and a single rope tow. Other runs and a lodge were added in following seasons, but the resort did not succeed financially and had to close. The resort was purchased by Boyne in the early 1960s, along with an adjoining 2900 acres to the north. It opened as Boyne Highlands in 1963 with two three-person chairlifts, the first triple chairlifts in the world. The current high-speed detachable quad chairlift was installed in 1990. In 1995, the resort expanded in to the North Peak area.

Boyne Highlands was re-branded as The Highlands at Harbor Springs in 2021.

The tenth season of The Big Break, The Big Break X: Michigan, was filmed there.

References

External links 
 The Highlands at Harbor Springs
 Boyne USA Resorts History fundinguniverse.com

Buildings and structures in Emmet County, Michigan
Ski areas and resorts in Michigan
Tourist attractions in Emmet County, Michigan